Howards End is a novel by E. M. Forster, first published in 1910, about social conventions, codes of conduct and relationships in turn-of-the-century England. Howards End is considered by many to be Forster's masterpiece. The book was conceived in June 1908 and worked on throughout the following year; it was completed in July 1910.

Premise
The story revolves around three families in England at the beginning of the 20th century: the Wilcoxes, rich capitalists with a fortune made in the colonies; the half-German Schlegel siblings (Margaret, Helen, and Tibby), whose cultural pursuits have much in common with the Bloomsbury Group; and the Basts, an impoverished young couple from a lower-class background. The idealistic, intelligent Schlegel sisters seek to help the struggling Basts and to rid the Wilcoxes of some of their deep-seated social and economic prejudices.

Plot summary 

The Schlegels had briefly met and befriended the Wilcoxes when both families were in Germany. Helen, the younger Schlegel daughter, visits the Wilcoxes at their country house, Howards End. She is attracted to the younger Wilcox son, Paul, and they become engaged in haste but soon regret their decision, breaking off the engagement by mutual consent.

Not long after, the Schlegel sisters attend a concert featuring a performance of Beethoven's Fifth Symphony. Helen is so entranced by the images the music creates in her mind that she leaves, inadvertently taking an umbrella that belongs to Leonard Bast. Margaret gives Leonard her card and invites him to come with her after the concert to retrieve the umbrella. Once there, Leonard is embarrassed by the shabby quality of his umbrella and quickly departs. 

Later that year, the Wilcoxes move to London, taking an apartment close to the Schlegels' house. Margaret befriends the Wilcox matriarch, Ruth. Howards End is Ruth's most prized possession; she feels a strong connection to the old house, which is not shared by her husband and children. Ruth becomes quite ill and, perceiving Margaret as a kindred spirit, on her deathbed writes a note leaving Howards End to Margaret. The note causes great consternation to the widowed Henry Wilcox. He and his children burn it without telling Margaret about her inheritance. 

Leonard Bast is living with but not married to Jacky, a vulnerable "fallen" woman for whom he feels responsible. He again encounters the Schlegels after Jacky finds Margaret's card and shows up at the Schlegels in search of her "husband", thoroughly mystifying Helen. The previous evening instead of coming home after work, Leonard had walked all night from the city out through the country, an action Helen looks on as adventurous. Later in the day, after Leonard has come and explained the situation, the Schlegels meet Henry Wilcox, as they are walking and discussing how they could best help the impoverished Basts. On hearing the name of the insurance company where Leonard works, Henry recommends that he quit his job, as the company is bound to "smash". The Schlegels share this information with Leonard. 

The friendship between Henry and Margaret blossoms into romance, and Henry proposes to Margaret, who accepts. Henry's children do not look upon the engagement with a friendly eye. But the only real opposition comes from older son Charles and his wife Dolly, who fear that Margaret endangers their inheritance of Howards End.

Sometime later, Helen shows up at the wedding of Evie Wilcox with Leonard Bast and Jacky, now married but desperately poor. Leonard had lost the job he took after leaving his previous employer, which did not go out of business but refused to take him back. Henry recognizes Jacky as his former mistress and thinks that the Schlegels and Basts have concocted a plot to expose him. Ten years previously, when on business in Cyprus, he seduced Jacky and then carelessly abandoned her. Margaret is dreadfully disturbed by this, but Henry's thinking is that 'such are the ways of the world'. Realizing that the affair had betrayed Ruth but not her, Margaret wishes to save the relationship and forgives him.

Helen profoundly disapproves how Henry "ruined" the lives of the Basts -- both his behavior to Jacky and his bad advice to Leonard. She spends the evening with Leonard in the Basts' hotel room. While Jacky is asleep in the next room, they talk far into the night. The next day, Helen appears in her brother Tibby's lodgings in Oxford, relaying the previous day's events, telling him she is going to Germany and asking him to send five thousand pounds to the Basts. Leonard returns the first check Tibby sends and declines any further funds. 

In the months following their wedding, Margaret becomes concerned because Helen keeps aimlessly moving about Europe. When the sisters' Aunt Juley becomes dangerously ill, Margaret telegraphs Helen, asking her to come home. When Aunt Juley recovers, they notify Helen, who has returned to England but refuses to see anyone in the family. Helen asks to pick up some of her books, which are in storage at Howards End along with the rest of the Schlegels' furniture. Concerned that her sister may be mentally ill, Margaret and Henry travel there to surprise Helen. They see her secret -- she is pregnant. Margaret stands by her sister and tries to convince Henry that, if she can forgive him his sin, he should forgive Helen hers. Henry remains unconvinced. 

The next day, Leonard arrives at Howards End, tormented by his affair with Helen, wishing to speak to Margaret, and unaware of Helen's presence. When Charles Wilcox attacks Leonard for "insulting" Helen, Leonard grabs onto a nearby bookcase, which collapses on top of him, causing his death from undiagnosed heart disease. Margaret tells Henry she is going to leave him, but he breaks down, saying that Charles will be charged with manslaughter for the death.

Charles Wilcox is found guilty and sentenced to three years in prison. The shame has a powerful effect on Henry, who tells his children that he will leave Howards End to Margaret, as his first wife Ruth had wished, and stipulates that, after Margaret's death, the property will go to her nephew, the son of Helen and Leonard. Warmly welcomed by Margaret and Henry, Helen brings up her son at Howards End.

Reception

In 1998, the Modern Library ranked Howards End 38th on its list of the 100 best English-language novels of the 20th century.

Rooks Nest House 

Forster based his description of Howards End on a house at the hamlet of Rooks Nest in Hertfordshire, his childhood home from 1883 to 1893. The house, known in Forster's childhood as "Rooksnest" had, as in the novel, been owned by a family named Howard, and the house itself had been called "Howards" in their day. According to his description in an appendix to the novel, Rooks Nest was a hamlet with a farm on the Weston Road just outside Stevenage.

The area to the north-west and west of Rooks Nest House is the only farmland remaining in Stevenage (the area to the east of the house now comprises the St Nicholas neighbourhood of the town). The landscape was termed "Forster country" in a letter to The Times signed by a number of literary figures, published on 29 December 1960. The letter was written in response to two compulsory purchase orders made by the Stevenage Development Corporation; it expressed the hope that 200 acres of the countryside around the house could be preserved both as one of the last beauty spots within 30 miles of London and "because it is the Forster country of Howards End." In 1979, the centenary of the author's birth, the area was officially named the Forster Country by local planners after efforts by a campaign group, the Friends of the Forster Country, which aimed to preserve for future generations the landscape that Forster knew. In 1997, a sculpture marking Forster's connection with the area was unveiled beside St Nicholas churchyard by the MP for Stevenage, Barbara Follett. In September 2017 Rooks Nest house was put up for sale.

Wickham Place, the London home of the Schlegel sisters, was demolished to make way for a block of flats; it did not have a direct real-world counterpart. Forster's conception of it owed a great deal to number 1 All Souls Place, where the sisters of Goldsworthy Lowes Dickinson lived.

Adaptations

Literature
On Beauty, a novel by Zadie Smith, is based on Howards End and was written as a homage to Forster.

Theatre

A stage adaptation by Lance Sieveking and Cottrell, was performed in 1967 on tour and at the New Theatre in London, with Gwen Watford, Gemma Jones, Michael Goodliffe, Joyce Carey and Andrew Ray in the cast. Forster co-operated in the production.

The Inheritance is a play in two parts by Matthew Lopez, which gets inspiration from the Forster novel to portray instead the generation that came after the height of the AIDS crisis, addressing the life of a young gay man in New York. The play opened on 2 March 2018, at Young Vic and later transferred to the West End at the Noël Coward Theatre. The production won four Olivier Awards including Best Play. The play opened on Broadway at the Ethel Barrymore Theatre in September 2019.

Television

A British television adaptation of the novel in the BBC's Play of the Month series was broadcast in 1970, and starred Leo Genn, Sarah-Jane Gwillim, and Glenda Jackson.

In November 2017, a four-part adaptation by Kenneth Lonergan was broadcast by the BBC. It was a co-production with US broadcaster Starz.

Film

A film version made in 1992 stars Emma Thompson, Vanessa Redgrave, Helena Bonham Carter, Anthony Hopkins, and Samuel West. The film was named Best Picture by BAFTA in 1992 and won the 45th Anniversary Prize at the Cannes Film Festival. At the 65th Academy Awards the film won three Academy Awards for films released in 1992: Thompson for Best Actress, Luciana Arrighi for Best Art Direction, and Ruth Prawer Jhabvala for Best Screenplay Based on Material Previously Produced or Published. It was also nominated for the Academy Award for Best Picture.

Radio
In 2009, a two-part adaptation by Amanda Dalton was broadcast on BBC Radio 4, with John Hurt as the narrator, Lisa Dillon as Margaret Schlegel, Jill Cardo as Helen Schlegel, Tom Ferguson as Tibby Schlegel, Alexandra Mathie as Aunt Juley, Malcolm Raeburn as Henry Wilcox, Ann Rye as Ruth Wilcox, and Joseph Kloska as Charles Wilcox.

Opera
Allen Shearer's opera Howards End, America (2016), with a libretto by Claudia Stevens, moves the action to 1950s Boston. The adaptation is discussed in Stevens' article "Page to Stage: A New Opera, Howards End, America" in the Polish Journal of English Studies.

References

External links 

 
 
 
 Howards End at the British Library
 Study guide with plot summary, analysis and background
 Free online notes, analysis and study questions

1910 British novels
Novels by E. M. Forster
British novels adapted into films
Novels adapted into operas
Novels adapted into radio programs
British novels adapted into television shows
British novels adapted into plays
Works set in country houses